Holidays in the British Virgin Islands are predominantly religious holidays, with a number of additional national holidays.  The most important holiday in the Territory is the August festival, which is celebrated on the three days from (and including) the first Monday in August to commemorate the abolition of slavery in the British Virgin Islands.

Where fixed date holidays (such as Christmas Day and Boxing Day) fall on a weekend, the holiday is normally taken in lieu on the next succeeding working day.  However, in 2010 when Christmas Day fell on a Saturday and Boxing Day fell on a Sunday, only one day off was given in lieu.  An official explanation offered by the Attorney General's department was that because those two days are both "common law holidays" and not statutory holidays, both of them were deferred to the same date – the next Monday.  The position taken by the Attorney General was somewhat surprising, as it differed with the common law position expressed to be taken in the United Kingdom.

See also
List of holidays by country

Footnotes

External links
BVI Government official list of holidays

British Virgin Islands
British Virgin Islands-related lists
British Virgin Islands culture
British Virgin Islands